is a Japanese video game writer employed by Square Enix. He is mostly known for his work on the role-playing video game series Final Fantasy and the action RPG series Kingdom Hearts.

Career

Watanabe first became interested in writing in junior high school in 1988, after reading the Wizardry novel Tonariawase no Hai to Seishun by Benny Matsuyama. Before he joined Square, Watanabe wrote manga novelizations. Final Fantasy X was the first Final Fantasy game that he worked on as scenario writer. Among others, he was responsible for the dialog in the Zanarkand Ruins which he almost wrote in one single night. He joined the Final Fantasy XIII team in early 2004 but left it again about half a year later. He instead became part of the Final Fantasy XII development team in November 2004. The original scenario writer Yasumi Matsuno left that project in August 2005 due to sickness. Hiroshi Minagawa, the co-director of Final Fantasy XII, expressed his regrets that many of the story ideas by Watanabe had to be dropped so the game could meet the deadline for the release. In March 2006, Watanabe rejoined the Final Fantasy XIII team after Kazushige Nojima and Motomu Toriyama had conceived a mythology and story for the game, respectively. He was shown a rough outline of the plot until chapter eight and was asked by Toriyama to flesh things out and to correct how it would all connect. Watanabe decided how Toriyama's rudimentary cutscene ideas should play out, wrote the script and adjusted the personality of each character to emphasize what the story tried to express. He said that the Final Fantasy XIII series was an exhausting project with little time to breathe and that his feelings toward it were "complicated". Watanabe not only wrote the scripts for the games but also a three-part novella titled Final Fantasy XIII Reminiscence: tracer of memories that was published in the Japanese game magazine Famitsu.

Works

Notes

References

External links
 
 Profile at ffx.sakura.ne.jp

Square Enix people
Final Fantasy designers
Video game designers
Video game writers
Living people
1974 births